Give It Away is the sixth studio album by Canadian country music artist Paul Brandt. It was released on September 13, 2011 on Brandt's record label, Brand-T Records. The album includes reworked versions of two of Brandt's earlier singles, "My Heart Has a History" and "I Do," as well as a cover of Red Simpson's "The Highway Patrol."

On December 8, 2011, it was announced that Give It Away was named the iTunes Rewind Canadian Country Album of the Year.

Track listing

Chart performance

Album

Singles

References

2011 albums
Paul Brandt albums